FC Bastion Chornomorsk ( formerly FC Bastion Illichivsk) is a Ukrainian football team from Chornomorsk (formerly Illichivsk) in Odessa oblast. They entered the professional leagues for the first time in 2008. After the 2010–11 season the club withdrew from Professional Football League of Ukraine and lost its professional status.

History

Bastion entered the professional leagues for the first time in 2008.

Bastion had been successful in the National Amateur League competitions (the Fourth Level of competition in Ukraine) including winning the Ukrainian Amateur Championship in 2007. The team was also successful in the regional oblast competition, the honor of which passed to its second (junior) team to enter this competition due to the reason that Bastion were admitted to the Professional Second League (see the Ukrainian Wikipedia Bastion-2). The club was also represented by its second team at the 2009 UEFA Regions' Cup as Odessa Oblast (Ukraine). The club did not qualify for the finals, placing second behind the host club representing Romania in the qualification tournament.

League and cup history

Bastion-2 Illichivsk

References

Bastion Illchivsk
Association football clubs established in 2005
2005 establishments in Ukraine
Football clubs in Chornomorsk